Phalacronotus apogon is a species of catfish of the genus Phalacronotus found in Southeast Asia. This species grows to a length of  SL.

This fish is common in the murky waters of large rivers in the basins of the Mekong and Chao Phraya, as well as in Peninsular Malaysia, Sumatra and Borneo.

As food
In Thailand it is one of the catfish species known in the markets as Pla nuea on (ปลาเนื้ออ่อน), often used for making fish balls. This fish is highly valued in Thai cuisine for its delicate flesh.

See also
List of Thai ingredients

References

External links

Siluridae
Fish of Asia
Fish of Cambodia
Fish of Indonesia
Fish of Laos
Freshwater fish of Malaysia
Fish of Thailand
Taxa named by Pieter Bleeker
Fish described in 1851